Marika (also spelled MARIKA) is a Canadian recording artist, singer, songwriter, actor, and TV show host. MARIKA has had two top 40 radio singles in Canada, as well as songs placed with Elise Estrada, Elin Universal Music Group Germany, and Korea's Lee Hyori with "My Life" M-NET and Kim Bo Kyung. She also has songs placed on several seasons of America's Next Top Model, MTV and her single "ANGEL" was featured on the Lifetime network's original movie Sins of the Mother. MARIKA performed back in Medicine Hat for the 2010 Winter Olympics Torch relay where she shared the stage with County Superstar Terri Clark. The pair were chosen to perform because of their Medicine Hat roots. MARIKA was also recognized as Virgin 95.3 CKZZ-FM Best of BC artist as a result of her single release in 2011 – "Soldier". MARIKA released in 2004 an album called Untitled Chances, followed by radio singles in 2006 and 2007 "Christmas Came Early", "You Know I Will", and "Radio". "You Know I Will" got MARIKA nominated as best new artist in the Urban Category at the Canadian Radio Music Awards in 2007. Her album Unstoppable released in 2013 won the GMA Covenant awards Pop album of the Year, and she also recently was a featured singer on the new Hallmark TV channel's original series Signed, Sealed, Delivered which was executive produced by Martha Williamson who wrote and produced Touched by an Angel. She also shared the stage with Grammy and Dove award winners Michael W. Smith, Steven Curtis Chapman, and Juno award winner Brian Doerksen on their one time only United Tour. In December 2013, she wrote "This Christmas Time" produced by 604 Records producer Colin Janz, which was released to radio across Canada and parts of the US and garnered national airplay. Marika was born in San Fernando, Trinidad, raised in England and Medicine Hat, Alberta. She currently resides in Vancouver, British Columbia.

References
 Langley Advance Times  
 Light Magazine BC 
 International doctor recognized  Women of Excellence Award
 TripleCord Photography
 94.5 Virgin Radio | Vancouver's #1 Hit Music Station
 Idol winner Avila, Plaskett among Canadian Radio Music Awards nominees CBC News. 16 January 2007

External links
 Marika Siewert 
 CEO Emerton Records 

Trinidad and Tobago emigrants to the United Kingdom
British emigrants to Canada
Year of birth missing (living people)
Living people
Musicians from Vancouver
People from Medicine Hat
People from San Fernando, Trinidad and Tobago
Siewert, Marika